Ipomoea batatoides is a species of flowering plant in the family Convolvulaceae.

This species is found in sub-deciduous tropical forest, from about 100 to 200 meters above sea level. It blooms from August to November.

The species is native to Belize, Bolivia, Brazil, Colombia, Costa Rica, Ecuador, El Salvador, French Guiana, Guatemala, Guyana, Honduras, Mexico, Nicaragua, Panamá, Peru, Suriname, and Venezuela.

References 

batatoides
Flora of Central America
Flora of South America
Taxa named by Jacques Denys Choisy